Greytown may refer to one of several places:
Greytown, KwaZulu-Natal, a town in South Africa
Greytown, New Zealand, a town in the southern North Island's Wairarapa region
Greytown, Nicaragua, the capital city of the municipality of San Juan de Nicaragua

See also
Graytown (disambiguation)